"Light in the Dark" is a song by female dance Belgian singer Kate Ryan. It was released as a non-album single on 24 May 2013, following her last album Electroshock. Released under Nextar Entertainment, after Ryan's departure from ARS Entertainment.

No official video has been released yet, but a Lyrics video is available on YouTube.

Track listing 
Digital download – single
"Light in the Dark" – 3:47

Digital download - EP
"Light in the Dark" (radio edit) – 3:47
"Light in the Dark" (Playb4ck remix) – 5:54
"Light in the Dark" (Romeo Blanco remix) – 5:38
"Light in the Dark" (Babl remix) – 3:23

References 

2013 singles
Kate Ryan songs
2013 songs
Songs written by Kate Ryan